Leroy Jordan (born November 21, 1948) is an American singer-songwriter. He is a founding member of the American funk band War. Jordan had a number of roles over the years, acting as vocalist and playing guitar, piano, synthesizer, and percussion. He was among the first three people to join the group after its inception, having joined before the group adopted the name "War" (it had previously been known as "the Creators" and "Nightshift"), as well as being the group's only remaining original member.

Jordan recorded as a solo artist with MCA in 1977 and Boardwalk in 1982. He has also recorded with Eric Burdon, Tanya Tucker, T. Rex and Los Lobos.
Jordan also made a record with two members of War, Harold Brown and B.B. Dickerson, The Other Side of War Warms Your Heart on Soufflé Records, which featured Bobby Womack on guitar. Lonnie Jordan is the only current member of War from the original lineup. Four other members created a new group called Lowrider Band. In 2017, Lonnie Jordan co-wrote and featured on vocals on Alex Puddu album From the Beginning on three songs "Runaway Boys", "Nobody" and "Stormy Weather".

Discography

1978: Different Moods of Me (US: #158)
1982: The Affair
2007: War Stories (produced by J. B. Eckl and Pancho Tomaselli)

References

Further reading
 Lonnie Jordan interview by Pete Lewis, 'Blues & Soul' August 1995 (reprinted April 2008)

1948 births
Living people
20th-century American guitarists
American funk guitarists
American male guitarists
Guitarists from California
Musicians from San Diego
MCA Records artists
War (American band) members